Guy of Bazoches (before 1146–1203) was a French cleric of the Champagne region, and writer in Latin. He was a canon of Châlons-sur-Marne.

He was a chronicler, of the Third Crusade in particular, in which he had taken part in the retinue of Henry II of Champagne, a poet, and a letter writer.

References
 Georg Heinrich Pertz, Die Briefe des Canonicus Guido von Bazoches, Cantors zu Chalons im zwölften Jahrhundert, Sitzungsberichte der Königlich Preussischen Akademie der Wissenschaften zu Berlin. 1890, I. pp. 161–179
 Wilhelm Wattenbach, Aus den Briefen des Guidos von Bazoches, Neues Archiv 16 (1890), 67-113,
 Wilhelm Wattenbach, Die Apologie des Guido von Bazoches. Sitzungsberichte der Königlich Preussischen Akademie der Wissenschaften zu Berlin. 1893, I. pp. 395–420
 John F. Benton, The Court of Champagne as a Literary Center, Speculum, Vol. 36, No. 4 (Oct., 1961), pp. 551–591
 Herbert Adolfsson, editor (1969), Liber epistularum Guidonis de Basochis

Notes

1203 deaths
French chroniclers
12th-century Latin writers
12th-century French historians
Medieval Latin poets
Year of birth uncertain
French male poets
12th-century French poets
Christians of the Third Crusade